Genrik Pavliukianec (born 17 June 1976) is a Lithuanian goalball player, he was regarded as the best striker in world. He competed at the five Paralympic Games and has won three medals including a gold medal at the Games, he was also three-time European champion and a double World champion.

References

1976 births
Living people
Sportspeople from Vilnius
Paralympic goalball players of Lithuania
Goalball players at the 2000 Summer Paralympics
Goalball players at the 2004 Summer Paralympics
Goalball players at the 2008 Summer Paralympics
Goalball players at the 2012 Summer Paralympics
Goalball players at the 2016 Summer Paralympics
Medalists at the 2000 Summer Paralympics
Medalists at the 2008 Summer Paralympics
Medalists at the 2016 Summer Paralympics
Goalball players at the 2020 Summer Paralympics